Marcus Maeder (born 7 December 1971, Zurich, Switzerland) is a sound artist, acoustic ecologist and composer of electronic music. As an author, Maeder has written on a number of topics in the fields of sound art, artistic research and digital media.

Education
Maeder studied Fine Arts at the Lucerne University of Applied Sciences, Philosophy at the FernUniversität in Hagen and currently pursues his PhD in Environmental Systems Science at ETH Zürich.

Career
Maeder co-runs the music label domizil, which he co-founded in 1996 with Bernd Schurer. Maeder has worked as an editor and producer for the Schweizer Radio und Fernsehen (SRF) and has been working as a curator and researcher at the Institute for Computer Music and Sound Technology (ICST) of the Zurich University of the Arts (ZHdK) since 2005. Maeder works periodically as a visiting scientist at the Swiss Federal Institute for Forest, Snow and Landscape Research (WSL) since 2016.

Science
In his research at the ICST, Maeder is working on acoustic ecology, ecoacoustics and data sonification of processes and phenomena related to climate change and environmental issues. Maeder uses metal probes equipped with sensors and pushed into the ground to detect underground noises, which can be amplified so that humans can hear them. Noises reveal a rich interplay of events, such as larvae chewing, worms crawling, plant roots growing and water moving.  Sounds can be used to indentify creatures and their activities, including their communications.  Quiet areas indicate decreases in biodiversity and less healthy soil. Maeder has organized a citizen science initiative in Switzerland in which people borrow acoustic sensors to record soil sounds in their neighborhoods, creating a national library of soil sounds that will provide a baseline for health of Switzerland's soil.

Art
On an invitation by French President François Hollande, Maeder presented his sound art installation trees: Pinus  sylvestris at the 2015 United Nations Climate Change Conference COP21.

In 2017 Maeder presented his installation AmazonFACE: Ocotea at the Inter-American Development Bank in Washington. Also in 2017  Maeder and Roman Zweifel received an honorable mention from the STARTS Prize by the European Commission at the Ars Electronica Festival in Linz/Austria for their works under the moniker treelab.

In 2021, Maeder showed his installation Silva - a commission by the Goethe Institute Tallinn - at the Estonian National Museum. Estonia's President Alar Karis visited the exhibition and held the opening speech.

Selected exhibitions and projects 
2021: Silva, Estonian National Museum, Tartu
2021: Earth Beats, Kunsthaus Zürich
2021: Landliebe, Bündner Kunstmuseum, Chur
2020: Critical Zones, Zentrum für Kunst und Medien ZKM, Karlsruhe
2019: Perimeter Pfynwald, Eco-Visionaries, Laboral Centro de Arte y Creation Industrial, Gijon
2019: treelab, Of plants and People, Deutsches Hygienemuseum, Dresden
2018: treelab, Eco-Visionaries, Haus der Elektronischen Künste, Basel
2018: Sounding Soil, Zentrum Paul Klee, Bern
2018: Espirito da floresta/Forest spirit, Bosque da Sciencia, Manaus
2017: Espirito da floresta/Forest spirit, Inter-American Development Bank IDB, Washington DC
2017: treelab, Ars Electronica Festival, Linz; BOZAR, Palais des Beaux-Arts, Bruxelles
2015: trees: Pinus sylvestris, UN-Klimakonferenz COP 21, Paris
2014: trees: Pinus sylvestris, SoundReasons Festival, Outset India, New Delhi
2014: trees: Downy Oak 2, Baum/Klang/Kunst/Mensch, Alpen Adria Universität Klagenfurt, mit Ch. Kubisch, B. Traubeck, W. Ritsch
2012: trees: Downy Oak, swissnex San Francisco, Workshop in Muir Woods
2011: Der Pfad zur linken Hand, Ein topografisches Hörspiel mit Jan Schacher/Jasch, Musikprotokoll Graz und Shedhalle Zürich
2010: Kuratierung der Ausstellung Milieux Sonores, Grey Area Foundation, San Francisco und Kunstraum Walcheturm, Zürich
2008: Sonifikationen und Kompositionen für das Nova-Lichtobjekt im Hauptbahnhof Zürich, ein Projekt der ETH Zürich
2008: Die Wunschmaschinen, Surround-Hörspiel nach Deleuze/Guattari's Anti-Ödipus, 40 Jahre 1968, Frankfurt und Kunstraum Walcheturm, Zürich
2007: Davos Soundscape, eine topografische Komposition mit Jan Schacher/Jasch, Davos Festival 2007
2004: Transient Travels, Installation und Kompositionen in einem Eisenbahnwaggon, World New Music Days 2004
2003: Electronic Music Archive, eine Ausstellung von Gianni Jetzer und Norbert Möslang (Voice Crack), Kunsthalle St. Gallen
2002: Musik und Sounddesign für die Expo.02, Expoagricole, Murten
1998: We Are Somewhere Else Already – Swiss Institute, New York

Discography
2020: crepuscule, cassette, domizil 48
2017: non-human, CD, domizil 45
2015: Progeny, CD, domizil 41
2013: topographie sinusoïdale, CD, domizil 38
2010: annex, Mini CD, domizil 33
2009: Wire Tapper, CD/The Wire(Compilation)
2009: subsegmental, CD, domizil 32
2008: Opera Calling, CD (Compilation) 
2008: Die Wunschmaschinen, DVD, domizil 30/ZHdK Records
2007: This ship in trouble, CD/online, domizil 24
2005: Transient Travels, VA, CD, domizil 23 (Compilation)
2004: domizil vs. Antifrost life, - Live CD, domizil 19 (Compilation)
2004: Club Transmediale, CD, Data Error (Compilation)
2004: La Suisse, CD, SME (Compilation)
2003: Bees & Honey, Andrey Kiritchenko, CD, Zeromoon (Remix)
2002: Quiconque, CD, domizil 17
2001: Poisonhats, CD, Arts Centre Dublin (Compilation)
2001: Substrat CD, CD, Stattmusik (Compilation)
2000: Institut für Feinmotorik: Verschiedene, CD, IFFM (Compilation)
1999: solipsistic_motion, LP, domizil 10

Bibliography
 Marcus Maeder (Hg.): Kunst, Wissenschaft, Natur. Zur Ästhetik und Epistemologie der künstlerisch-wissenschaftlichen Naturbeobachtung. Bielefeld: Transcript Verlag, 2017, 
 Marcus Maeder & Roman Zweifel: trees: Pinus sylvestris'', an artistic-scientific observation system at the COP 21. Zurich: domizil; 
Marcus Maeder (Hg.): Milieux Sonores - Klangliche Milieus. Klang, Raum und Virtualität. Bielefeld: Transcript Verlag, 2010; 
Bruno Spoerri (Hg.): Musik aus dem Nichts. Die Geschichte der Elektroakustischen Musik in der Schweiz. Zürich: Chronos Verlag, 2010,

References

External links
 Official website
Discogs entry
Homepage
Music label domizil
Institute for Computer Music and Sound Technology

1971 births
Living people
21st-century Swiss musicians